The Cherry Blossom Sharjah Cup was a One Day International cricket tournament held in Sharjah during April 2003. The games took place at Sharjah Cricket Association Stadium. Seven matches were played during the tournament, including the final. Final of the tournament was played between Pakistan and Zimbabwe which Pakistan won by eight wickets. After scoring two centuries, Kumar Sangakkara was named the man of the series.
 It was Sanath Jayasuriya's last tournament as Sri Lankan captain.

Squads

Points table

Round robin matches

Match 1

Match 2

Match 3

Match 4

Match 5

Match 6

Final

References

External links
 Cherry Blossom Sharjah Cup 2002/03 – Cricket Archive
 Cherry Blossom Sharjah Cup 2002/03 – ESPNCricinfo

2003 in cricket
International cricket competitions in 2002–03
International cricket competitions in 2003
One Day International cricket competitions